Antony Szeto (司徒永華), (born 9 December 1964) is a film director and martial artist.

Early life and education 
Szeto was born in Sydney, Australia. He studied martial arts at Beijing Sport University. Upon graduation, he returned to Australia and double-majored in film and finance at Bond University, going to the United Kingdom for his master's degree. His family started in ship repairing, which later developed into high-speed ship construction. It was founded by his father, Szeto Fai, a merchant politician and People's Congress of China member.

Career 
Szeto directed Hong Kong's first CGI animated feature film, DragonBlade (2005). Voiced by Daniel Wu, Karen Mok, Stephen Fung and Sandra Ng, DragonBlade earned a Golden Horse Awards nomination and won an award from the Australian Directors Guild. Szeto also directed a family action film produced by Jackie Chan, Jackie Chan Presents: Wushu (2008) starring Sammo Hung and Max Zhang. In 2011 Szeto was hired by the Hollywood producer Roger Corman to direct two films, Palace of the Damned (2013) and Fist of the Dragon (2014). Szeto was also stunt coordinator for The Meg.

Personal life
On 1 October 2019, Szeto married actress JuJu Chan Szeto in Los Angeles.

Filmography

References

External links
Antony Szeto on Instagram
Antony Szeto on Facebook

1964 births
Living people
People from Sydney
American film directors
Hong Kong directors
Bond University alumni